Friedrich Weber (3 August 1781, Kiel – 21 March 1823, Kiel) was a German physician, botanist and entomologist. These two works contained the first descriptions of many new insect species and also first descriptions of other invertebrates like the lobster genus Homarus.

Partial list of works
 1795 : Nomenclator entomologicus secundum entomologian systematicam ill. Fabricii, adjectis speciebus recens detectis et varietatibus. Chiloni et Hamburgi: C.E. Bohn viii 171 pp.
1801. Observationes entomologicae, continentes novorum quae condidit generum characteres, et nuper detectarum specierum descriptiones. Impensis Bibliopolii Academici Novi, Kiliae, 12 + 116 pp. [xerox: 112-116]
with M. H. Mohr 1804. Naturhistorische Reise durch einen Theil Schwedens. Göttingen.

References

External links

1781 births
1823 deaths
19th-century German botanists
German entomologists
German carcinologists
19th-century German physicians
Scientists from Kiel